Yonggang station is a railway station on the Gyeongjeon Line and Deoksan Line in South Korea. The Deoksan Line connects to Deoksan station. 

Railway stations in South Gyeongsang Province